Grandhotel is a Czech novel, written by Jaroslav Rudiš. It was first published in 2006 and later in the year made into the film of the same name, directed by David Ondricek.

Notes

2006 Czech novels